The 2014 by-election for the House of Commons constituency of Clacton in Essex, England, took place on 9 October 2014. The by-election was triggered by the Conservative MP for Clacton, Douglas Carswell, defecting to the UK Independence Party (UKIP) and subsequently resigning his seat to seek re-election as its candidate.

Standing for UKIP, Carswell retained the seat with 59.7% of the vote, becoming UKIP's first elected MP. The Conservatives came second, and Labour third.  According to John Curtice, professor of politics at Strathclyde University, the result was the biggest increase in the share of a vote for any party in any by-election in history.

Background
On 28 August 2014, Douglas Carswell, a Eurosceptic Conservative backbencher, announced his defection to UKIP and said that he was resigning his seat in order to fight a by-election. He said he did not think Prime Minister David Cameron was "serious about the change we need", adding that "many of those at the top of the Conservative Party are simply not on our side" and "Of course they talk the talk before elections. They say what they feel they must say to get our support when they want our support, but on so many issues – on modernising our politics, on the recall of MPs, on controlling our borders, on less government, on bank reform, on cutting public debt, on an EU referendum – they never actually make it happen". He also said: "...local issues regarding planning and overcrowding of GP surgeries were a factor in my decision to resign".

Responding to the news that Carswell had defected and would trigger a by-election, Cameron said the contest would be held "as soon as possible". He also confirmed that the Conservatives would contest the by-election. It was later announced that the by-election would be held on 9 October. The poll was one of two parliamentary by-elections the same day, with an election also being held in the constituency of Heywood and Middleton following the death of its MP, Jim Dobbin of the Labour Party.

Analysis of demographics for the constituency prior to the by-election were said to make it the most UKIP-friendly in the country.

2010 general election result

UKIP did not stand a candidate against Douglas Carswell in 2010, citing his Eurosceptic views.

Reaction

Conservative
Most Conservatives condemned Carswell's defection, but some were more supportive of his decision. Cameron called the resignation "deeply regrettable"; he also argued that it was counter-productive, on the grounds that only a Conservative government after the next general election could deliver a referendum on British membership of the EU – an argument echoed by many Conservative MPs, such as Mark Pritchard, Bernard Jenkin and Nigel Evans. A spokesman for the party said that the Conservatives would contest the by-election.

Evans also suggested, however, that the Conservatives should consider not standing in the by-election, which he called "a total distraction", while the backbencher Zac Goldsmith described Carswell as a "model Parliamentarian" and remarked that "I have nothing but admiration for him". The former Conservative minister Norman Tebbit refused to campaign against Carswell and said "[t]he House of Commons needs men of his quality".

Nick Herbert, a Conservative MP and former policing minister, criticised the Conservative Party for being, in his view, more concerned with the Clacton by-election rather than winning the Scottish independence referendum, which was held on 18 September 2014, during the Clacton campaign.
During the campaign, on 27 September 2014, a second Conservative MP and close friend of Carswell's, Mark Reckless, likewise defected to UKIP and sought re-election in a by-election for his constituency of Rochester and Strood in Kent.

Other reactions
Labour Party leader Ed Miliband called Carswell's resignation "a blow for David Cameron", and said that it showed that the Conservative Party was divided. Bob Russell, the Liberal Democrat MP for Colchester (which borders the constituency of Clacton), stated that the resignation was a "huge embarrassment" for the party and that Carswell was "far to the right of the party".

Candidates

UKIP
Carswell announced that he would stand again for the seat as UKIP's candidate, although he was opposed by the recently selected UKIP candidate, the councillor Roger Lord. Lord had previously contested three general elections as the UKIP candidate; North Essex in 1997, Colchester in 2001 and Braintree in 2005.

Some local activists speculated that they might not adopt Carswell; Anne Poonian, the secretary of the Clacton UKIP association, was quoted by BuzzFeed saying that, although she welcomed Carswell's decision to defect, he may not be selected. However, UKIP rules for selecting by-election candidates invested the decision with the party's National Executive Committee, which selected Carswell. Lord left UKIP and resigned his County Council seat, supporting the Liberal Democrats in the council by-election.

Conservative
There was speculation that Boris Johnson, the Conservative Mayor of London, would seek the candidacy at the by-election. On 29 August 2014, The Daily Telegraph journalist Peter Oborne wrote: "David Cameron should go down on his knees and beg Boris Johnson to stand as the Conservative Party's candidate for Clacton in the coming by-election." Two Conservative MPs, Matthew Offord and John Stevenson, wrote a joint article calling for Johnson to stand in the by-election. The bookmaker Ladbrokes offered odds of 33–1 against Johnson standing in Clacton. He ruled out standing, saying that he was intent on fighting Uxbridge and South Ruislip at the general election.

The Conservative candidate was the actor and Tendring District councillor Giles Watling who was chosen by an open primary, in which 240 local residents voted, on 11 September. He was shortlisted with Colchester councillor Sue Lissimore.

Other candidates
The Colchester councillor Tim Young was selected as the Labour candidate for the constituency in 2013 for the next general election, and became the party's by-election candidate.

The Liberal Democrat candidate, Andy Graham, is the former mayor of Bishop's Stortford in Hertfordshire, as well as an actor and author of children's books.

The Green Party candidate was the environmentalist Chris Southall, who had stood for the party in previous general and local elections. He gained some notoriety for a UFO hoax in the 1960s.

Alan "Howling Laud" Hope was the candidate for the Official Monster Raving Loony Party. He is also the leader of the party and the former mayor of Ashburton, Devon.

Charlotte Rose and Bruce Sizer were independent candidates.  Rose described herself as a "high class courtesan" campaigning "for sexual freedom" and improved sex education in schools. Sizer was a consultant oncologist at Colchester Hospital who stood as a single-issue candidate to get health and cancer care onto the agenda of the political parties.  He was Joint Clinical Director of the Essex Cancer Network from 2006 until 2008 and is an honorary research professor at the University of Essex.

Campaign
UKIP claimed to have recruited 150 local Conservative members following Carswell's defection.

The journalist and former Conservative MP, Matthew Parris, created a controversy by writing in The Times that the Conservatives should be "careless" of Clacton voters’ opinions as "Clacton-on-Sea is going nowhere", remarks which were disowned by local Conservatives and denounced by Carswell as "reflective of what so many in the upper echelons of the Tory party really think" and were cited by two local Conservative councillors as a reason for defecting to UKIP.

An important component of the UKIP campaign was a public meeting of 700 people at the Clacton Coastal Academy with Douglas Carswell and UKIP leader Nigel Farage which was billed as the "biggest public meeting in Clacton in living memory".

Both the Prime Minister David Cameron and the Labour leader Ed Miliband visited the constituency to help their respective party campaigns.

Ten days before the election, the artist Banksy painted a mural on a wall in Clacton which showed five grey pigeons holding three placards. They held the words "go back to Africa"  "migrants not welcome", and "keep off our worms". They were directed towards a more colourful migratory swallow perched further along the same wire.  The mural was removed by Tendring District Council who had  received a complaint that "offensive and racist remarks" had appeared on a wall.

Two days before the election, Boris Johnson was unable to remember the name of the Conservative candidate in the by-election during an interview with Nick Ferrari, saying "he's a superb man. Stirling? Girling? Something like that".

Polling

Results and analysis

 

The election produced a number of statistical records, partly because of the unusual situation in which an incumbent MP with a large majority for one party has resigned and then stood for re-election on behalf of a new party for which support was in any case on a strongly rising trend. The 59.7% increase in the percentage vote achieved by UKIP since the previous general election (when they did not field a candidate) is the greatest ever in British parliamentary elections, although the percentage swing remains 0.1% less than the record 44.2% swing to the Liberal Party at the 1983 Bermondsey by-election.  The 28.4% reduction in Conservative votes is the 16th worst for any party since the Second World War, while the 1.4% of the vote achieved by the Liberal Democrats was, at the time, the third smallest vote ever obtained by a major party, and the worst since World War II. Since then, however, the Liberal Democrats received an even smaller proportion of the vote at the Rochester and Strood by-election later in 2014.

Aftermath
In November 2014, Mark Reckless won the Rochester and Strood by-election, giving UKIP a second MP. At the 2015 general election, Carswell retained his seat, becoming UKIP's only MP, though the party received 13% of the vote nationally (Reckless lost his seat to the Conservatives). Giles Watling was the Conservative candidate again, and came second in the constituency, 3,347 votes behind Carswell. The Conservative Party won an overall majority in the general election. In their manifesto, they had promised to hold a referendum on British membership of the European Union, which was held on 23 June 2016. The UK voted to leave the EU, with 52% of votes cast in favour of leaving.

In March 2017, Carswell left UKIP and became an independent MP. He did not stand in the 2017 general election, instead supporting the Conservative candidate in Clacton. In the general election, Watling won the seat for the Conservatives, with a large majority over the second-place Labour candidate (the UKIP candidate came third, receiving 8% of the vote). At the 2019 general election, Watling increased his majority further, receiving almost three-quarters of the vote.

See also

2014 European Parliament election in the United Kingdom
List of United Kingdom by-elections (2010–present)
Opinion polling for the 2015 United Kingdom general election
Opinion polling in United Kingdom constituencies (2010–2015)

References

Clacton by-election
Clacton by-election
Clacton by-election
By-elections to the Parliament of the United Kingdom in Essex constituencies
Tendring
2010s in Essex
UK Independence Party